King Ari'imate Teurura'i (1824 – 14 April 1874) was a member and founder of a Polynesian royal family (House of Teurura'i) which reigned on the Tahitian island of Huahine and Mai'ao during the 19th century. In Tahitian, his name translate as "sovereign-demised" and "the-sky-forest" respectively.

He was installed as king of Huahine in 1852 until his deposition in 1868.

Family 
Ari'imate Teururai was born at Huahine in 1824. He was the second child and only son of Chief Ta'aroa Ari'i and Té-mata-fainu'u vahine. He was the paternal grandson of Mahine Tehei'ura, who reigned as King of Huahine from 1810 to 1815 but abdicated in favor of his niece Teri'itaria II instead of his own son. In his early years, he ruled as the chief of Téfaréri'i.

Founder of the Teururai dynasty 
In the beginning of the 1850 year, a civil war deposed Teriitari'a II. The main dignitaries chose him to be king and that is why he assumed the sovereignty, 18 March 1852.
He was installed as king of Huahine in 1852. His crowning took place on March 18, 1852. He took the reign name of Teurura'i.

Twenty year later, a new civil war deposed him in favour of his wife.

Marriage and children 

He married in 1840 Princess Maerehia Tamatoa, heiress presumptive to her father King Tamatoa IV of Ra'iatea and Taha'a, and had twelve children:
 Princess Témari'i Teururai (1848–1891), Queen of Huahine.
 Princess Tapiria Teururai (1850–1888).
 Crown Prince Marama Teururai (1851–1909), Head of the royal family of Huahine and father of Teha'apapa III.
 Princess Vai-ra'a-toa Teururai, she had issue.
 Prince Ari'imate Teururai (1853–1907), or Tamatoa VI, last king of Rai'atea.
 Prince Téri'i-té-po-rou-ara'i Teururai (1857–1899), his family established in Tahiti.
 Prince Fatino Marae-ta'ata Teururai (1859–1884), he had eight children.
 Princess Tu-rai-ari'i Teururai (1862–?), she had two children through an irregular union.
 Princess Téri'i-na-va-ho-ro'a Teururai (1863–1918), she had eleven children.
 Princess Té-fa'a-ora Teururai (1868–1928), she had two daughters.

Their children remain member to the royal family of the former kingdom of Huahine-Maia'o and Raiatea-Taha'a since the end of the monarchy.

Ari'imate died at Huahine on 14 April 1874.

Ancestry

See also 
List of monarchs of Huahine
List of monarchs of Tahiti
List of monarchs who lost their thrones in the 19th century (Rai'atea)

References 

 Tahiti, les temps et les pouvoirs. Pour une anthropologie historique du Tahiti post-européen, Paris, ORSTOM, 543 p., Jean-François BARE.
 Trois ans chez les Canaques. Odyssée d'un Neuchâtelois autour du monde. Lausanne, Payot & C° Editeurs, 342p., Eugène HANNI.
 Tahiti aux temps anciens (traduction française de Bertrand Jaunez, Pars, Musée de l'Homme, Société des Océanistes, 671p. (édition originale Ancient Tahiti, Honolulu 1928) de Teuira Henry.
 Huahine aux temps anciens, Cahiers du Patrimoine [Savoirs et traditions] et Tradition orale, B.SAURA, édition 2006.
 Chefs et notables au temps du protectorat: 1842–1880, Société des Etudes Océaniennes, Raoul TEISSIER, réédition de 1996.

External links 
Genealogy

1824 births
1874 deaths
Huahine royalty
19th-century monarchs in Oceania